Police are organizations established to maintain law and order.

Police may also refer to:

Police agencies

National
Algerian police
Australian Federal Police (nationwide; see also various state-wise police forces)
Federal Police (Belgium)
Bosnian police
Federal Police of Brazil
British South Africa Police
Royal Canadian Mounted Police
Police of the Czech Republic
Dubai Police Force
Police of Finland
National Police (France)
Federal Police (Germany)
Hong Kong Police Force
Rendőrség (Hungarian police)
Icelandic Police
Indian Police Service
Indonesian National Police
Israel Police
Kuwait Police
Policja (Poland)
National Police Agency (South Korea)
Militsiya (Soviet Union)
Swedish Police Authority
New Zealand Police
Nigeria Police Force

Special
Airport police (airport security force)
Auxiliary police
Border police (border patrol)
Campus police
Capitol police
Company police
County police (county sheriff)
Cyber police (disambiguation)
Federal police (federales or feds)
Fire police
Highway police (highway patrol)
Judicial police
Military police
Moral police
Mounted police
Municipal police
National police (disambiguation)
Order police
Ordnungspolizei (Nazi Germany)
Paramilitary police (disambiguation)
Park police (park ranger)
Private police
Railroad police
Federal Railroad Police (Brazil)
Regimental police
Riot police
Rural police (gendarmerie)
Secret police
Secret State Police (Gestapo of Nazi Germany)
Security police (security forces)
Special police forces
State police (state trooper)
State police (United States)
Territorial police force
Traffic police
Transit police
Tribal police (disambiguation)
Water police

Entertainment
 The Police, a British band
 The Police (album), a 2007 compilation album by the band
 Police (1916 film), a film starring Charlie Chaplin
 The Police, a 1971 TV film directed by Fielder Cook
 Police (TV series), a 1982 documentary series by Roger Graef
 Police (1985 film), by Maurice Pialat
 Police (2005 film), a Malayalam film by V. K. Prakash
 The Police (play), by Sławomir Mrożek
 Police (novel), a 2013 crime novel by Jo Nesbø

Places

Czech Republic
Police (Šumperk District), a municipality and village in the Olomouc Region
Police (Třebíč District), a municipality and village in the Vysočina Region
Police (Vsetín District), a municipality and village in the Zlín Region
Police nad Metují, a town in the Hradec Králové Region
Horní Police, a municipality and village in the Liberec Region

Poland
Polica (mountain), a mountain in the south
Police, West Pomeranian Voivodeship, a city in the north-west
Police County, a unit of territorial administration
Port of Police, a seaport on the Oder River in the north-west
Police, Greater Poland Voivodeship, a village in the west-central
Police, Lower Silesian Voivodeship, a village in the south-west

Slovenia
Police, Cerkno, a village in the municipality of Cerkno
Police, Gornja Radgona, a village in the municipality of Gornja Radgona

Other uses
 Police (brand), an Italian manufacturer of fashion accessories
 Police F.C. (Rwanda), an association football club

See also

 Police force
 Police officer
 Police state
 Politz (disambiguation)
 Pollitz
 Police tactical unit
 Police aviation
 SWAT, US law enforcement units which use specialized or military equipment and tactics
 Law enforcement
 List of police tactical units